Andreas Wimmer is a Swiss sociologist who is the Lieber Professor of Sociology and Political Philosophy at Columbia University. He has a PhD in social anthropology from the University of Zurich. 
He is known for his research on nationalism, nation building, and ethnic conflict.
He is credited with having "notably revitalized the macropolitical study of nationalism."

Wimmer's research into the processes and conditions affecting the development of nation-states suggest that different conditions may have led to the development of nation-states at different times. In Great Britain, France, and the United States, Wimmer argues that elites and masses slowly grew to identify with each other as states were established in which more people were able to participate politically and receive public goods in exchange for taxes. Conditions affecting recent, geographically diverse, postcolonial states may not be comparable.

Nation Building: Why Some Countries Come Together While Others Fall Apart 
Wimmer was awarded the 2019 Stein Rokkan Prize for Comparative Social Science Research in recognition of his book Nation Building: Why Some Countries Come Together While Others Fall Apart. In the book, he argues that three factors tend to determine whether nation-building succeeds in the long term: "the early development of civil-society organisations, the rise of a state capable of providing public goods evenly across a territory, and the emergence of a shared medium of communication." Harris Mylonas described the book as an "instant classic comparable to Karl Deutsch's Nationalism and Social Communication (1953) or Ernest Gellner's Nations and Nationalism (1983)." 

Wimmer does not see ethnic or racial diversity in themselves as detrimental to nation-building.  Groups that are not a target of ethnopolitical conflict, that have access to power, and feel that their group is included in a nation, are more likely to report pride in that nation. Where political institutions become exclusionary, ethnic groups are less likely to feel a sense of national belonging. 

Wimmer argues instead that linguistic diversity is a key stumbling block to nation-building. He argues that a shared language makes it easier for political alliances and networks to emerge within a prospective nation that ultimately contribute to shared national identification.

Selected works 

 Andreas Wimmer, Ethnic Boundary Making: Institutions, Power, Networks, New York, Oxford University Press, 2013. 
 Andreas Wimmer, Waves of War: Nationalism, State Formation, and Ethnic Exclusion in the Modern World, Cambridge, Cambridge University Press, 2013.
 Andreas Wimmer, Nation Building: Why Some Countries Come Together While Others Fall Apart, Lawrenceville, Princeton University Press, 2017.

References 

Columbia University faculty
Living people
Political sociologists
Scholars of nationalism
Swiss political philosophers
Swiss sociologists
Winners of the Stein Rokkan Prize for Comparative Social Science Research
Year of birth missing (living people)